The Myanmar Convention Centre is a convention centre located in Yangon, the former capital city of Myanmar. Situated on Min Dhama Road in Mayangon Township, the venue hosts numerous business and entertainment events, while the Exhibition Centre provides large space for outdoor activities, events and trade fairs.

References

Buildings and structures in Yangon